Haynes Cave is a cave within the Greenbrier River watershed in West Virginia.  It sits within the complex hydrology of the historic Second Creek watershed in Monroe County.

Haynes Cave has been the only contender against Organ Cave as the discovery site for Thomas Jefferson's famous fossil of Megalonyx jeffersonii ("Jefferson's ground sloth").  The lack of accurate records and the vagueness of the descriptions had left much room in doubt for the true location of the sloth skeleton.  Jefferson wanted to link the bones with early reports of a giant lion in North America, but knew the fossil was incomplete.  He chose, until further discovery, to restrict the name to "Great-Claw," for it was at the time the most distinguishing characteristic of the skeleton.

It was known that the saltpetre miners in the cave were using one of the sloth's leg-bones to prop up a saltpetre vat to aid in the process of manufacturing gunpowder nitre, but this leg was lost to time.  Both Thomas Jefferson and the initial discoverer, Colonel John Stuart, hoped to find the skull of the beast, for the teeth would reveal its proper identity as a carnivore or herbivore.

In 1797, Thomas Jefferson presented the bones to the American Philosophical Society in Philadelphia and the species was later named Megalonyx jeffersonii in his honor in 1822.  In 1799, Dr. Caspar Wistar correctly identified the remains as belonging to a giant ground sloth.

Jefferson is credited for initiating the science of vertebrate paleontology in the United States with the reading of this paper. The "certain bones" consisted of three large (8”) claws and associated smaller bones. He theorized that they were the remains of an extinct lion which he named Megalonyx ("giant claw").  These were later found to be the claw core, and not the claw itself.

On September 19, 2008, the official news of this significant fossil discovery was released, and carbon dating from a Haynes Cave sloth scapula was proven a match to the skeleton excavated by Colonel John Stuart of Greenbrier County.  Since March 2008, the Megalonyx has been the official "state fossil" of West Virginia.

References

External links
"Megalonyx jeffersonii Jefferson Ground Sloth NOW The Official WV State Fossil" at prehistoricplanet.com.

Caves of West Virginia
Cenozoic paleontological sites of North America
Geography of Greenbrier County, West Virginia
Geography of Monroe County, West Virginia
Landforms of Greenbrier County, West Virginia
Landforms of Monroe County, West Virginia
Paleontology in West Virginia